The 1906 SAFA Grand Final was an Australian rules football competition. Port Adelaide beat North Adelaide by 60 to 39.

References 

SANFL Grand Finals
SAFL Grand Final, 1906